Borislav Borisov (Bulgarian: Борислав Борисов; born 27 September 1990) is a Bulgarian footballer who plays as a forward.

Career
Borisov started his career at Bdin Vidin. He scored 16 goals during 2010–11 season in the North-West V AFG and helped the team to B PFG promotion.

In early 2012, Borisov completed his move to Litex Lovech on a free transfer. On 2 February, he joined Montana on loan until the end of the season. Borisov made his A PFG debut on 3 March, in a 3–2 away win over Kaliakra Kavarna, coming off the bench to score Montana's third goal.

Borisov played for Sozopol for one season but was released in June 2017. In July 2017, he joined Botev Vratsa.  He left the club at the end of the 2017–18 season.

Club statistics

(Correct as of 1 June 2012)

References

External links
 
 

1990 births
Living people
Bulgarian footballers
First Professional Football League (Bulgaria) players
Second Professional Football League (Bulgaria) players
OFC Bdin Vidin players
PFC Litex Lovech players
FC Montana players
FC Lyubimets players
PFC Spartak Varna players
PFC Chernomorets Burgas players
Neftochimic Burgas players
FC Sozopol players
FC Botev Vratsa players
Association football wingers